Germeten is a surname. Notable people with the surname include:

Else Germeten (1918–1992), Norwegian women's group executive and film censor
Gunnar Germeten (1918–1995), Norwegian civil servant

Surnames of Norwegian origin